Dom (Polish for House) is a 1958 Polish short film directed by Walerian Borowczyk and Jan Lenica. The short combines live action with various animation techniques, such as stop motion, cut-out animation and pixilation.

Plot
A woman (played by Borowczyk's wife Ligia Branice) has a series of surreal, dream-like hallucinations and encounters within the confines of a lonely apartment building. Some of these bizarre occurrences include various abstract objects appearing in a room, two men engaging in fencing and martial arts, a man entering and leaving a room repeatedly, and a living wig destroying several items on a table. The film ends with the woman passionately kissing a male mannequin's face before it crumbles to pieces.

Awards
Dom was nominated to the 1959 BAFTA Film Award, in the category "Best Animated Film", but lost to The Violinist.

See also
 List of avant-garde films of the 1950s

References

External links

House – Walerian Borowczyk, Jan Lenica on Culture.pl

1958 animated films
1958 films
1950s animated short films
Films directed by Walerian Borowczyk
Films with live action and animation
Polish animated short films
Polish short films
Films using stop-motion animation